Visa requirements for Tongan citizens are administrative entry restrictions by the authorities of other states placed on citizens of Tonga. As of 2 July 2019, Tongan citizens had visa-free or visa on arrival access to 123 countries and territories, ranking the Tongan passport 46th in terms of travel freedom according to the Henley Passport Index.

Tonga signed a mutual visa waiver agreement with Schengen Area countries on 20 November 2015.

Visa requirements map

Visa requirements

Dependent, Disputed, or Restricted territories
Unrecognized or partially recognized countries

Dependent and autonomous territories

Non-visa restrictions

See also 

Visa policy of Tonga
Tongan passport

References and Notes
References

Notes

Tonga
Foreign relations of Tonga